The 2002 Miami RedHawks football team represented the Miami University in the 2002 NCAA Division I-A football season. They played their home games at Yager Stadium in Oxford, Ohio and competed as members of the Mid-American Conference. The team was coached by head coach Terry Hoeppner. Despite finishing 7-5, the RedHawks did not receive a bowl bid.

Schedule

Roster

Miami
Miami RedHawks football seasons
Miami RedHawks football